The Frozen Child (Hungarian:A Megfagyott gyermek) is a 1921 Hungarian silent drama film directed by Béla Balogh and starring Mária Szepes, Ferenc Szécsi, Anna Breznay and Viktor Galánthay. It is one of the few surviving Hungarian films of the early 1920s. It was unusual for its depiction of poverty in Hungary at a time when this was discouraged or censored by the authorities.

Cast
 Mária Szepes - Terike 
 Ferenc Szécsi - Lacika 
 Anna Breznay - Házmesterné 
 Mór Ditrói - Pap 
 Viktor Galánthay - Nagy Jóska 
 Rezsö Inke - Barabás, Terike apja 
 Ilona Linke - Kovácsné, Lacika anyja 
 Imre Pintér - Vincze bácsi

References

Bibliography
 Cunningham, John. Hungarian Cinema: From Coffee House to Multiplex. Wallflower Press, 2004.

External links

1921 films
Hungarian silent feature films
Hungarian drama films
Hungarian-language films
Films directed by Béla Balogh
Films set in Hungary
Hungarian black-and-white films
1921 drama films
Silent drama films